Jason Douglas Woolley (born July 27, 1969) is a Canadian former professional ice hockey defenceman. He played in the National Hockey League for the Washington Capitals, Florida Panthers, Pittsburgh Penguins, Buffalo Sabres, and Detroit Red Wings.

Playing career 
As a youth, Woolley played in the 1981 and 1982 Quebec International Pee-Wee Hockey Tournaments with a minor ice hockey team from Mississauga.

Woolley attended Michigan State University in East Lansing, MI before the Washington Capitals selected him 61st overall in the 1989 NHL Draft. Woolley's most productive NHL season was his 1998–99 campaign with the Buffalo Sabres in which he netted 10 goals and 33 assists (43 points).  Fittingly, that year was also Woolley's finest playoff performance (4 goals, 11 assists, 15 points) as his Sabres advanced to the Stanley Cup Finals before falling to the Dallas Stars in six games. Woolley scored a dramatic game-winning OT goal in Game 1 of that series, labelled as "the shot heard round the hockey world" by Sabres announcer Rick Jeanneret.

Following a torn ACL to defenseman Jiri Fischer in November of 2002, the Red Wings acquired Woolley from the Sabres for a conditional draft pick. During Woolley's tenure with the Red Wings, they would play Sam The Sham & Pharoh's Woolly Bully when he scored at Joe Louis Arena.  Woolley was also a participant in the 2014 Bridgestone NHL Alumni Winter Showdown at Comerica Park on December 31, 2013, representing the Detroit Red Wings.

International play

He played for Canada at the 1992 Winter Olympics. Woolley recorded five assists in eight games with the team, scored a shootout goal, and won a silver medal.

Personal
Woolley now operates The Players Group Hockey, a player agency based in Birmingham, Michigan.

Career statistics

Regular season and playoffs

International

Awards and honours

References

External links
 

1969 births
Living people
Baltimore Skipjacks players
Buffalo Sabres players
Canadian ice hockey defencemen
Detroit Red Wings players
Florida Panthers players
Ice hockey people from Toronto
Ice hockey players at the 1992 Winter Olympics
Malmö Redhawks players
Medalists at the 1992 Winter Olympics
Michigan State Spartans men's ice hockey players
Olympic ice hockey players of Canada
Olympic medalists in ice hockey
Olympic silver medalists for Canada
Pittsburgh Penguins players
Portland Pirates players
Washington Capitals draft picks
Washington Capitals players
Canadian expatriate ice hockey players in Sweden
AHCA Division I men's ice hockey All-Americans